Leslie Herod (born 1982) is an American politician, who was first elected to the Colorado House of Representatives in the 2016 elections. She serves on the House Joint Budget Committee, and the Legislative Interim Committee on School Finance, and is Chair of the House Appropriations Committee. A member of the Democratic Party, she represents the 8th district. She is the first gay African-American to be elected to Colorado's state legislature.

Biography
Herod was born in 1982 on a United States military base in Germany. She moved around much of her early life, as her mother was an officer in the United States Army Nurse Corps. Herod attended high school in Colorado Springs, Colorado. She received her Bachelor of Arts from the University of Colorado Boulder. In 2017, Herod completed Harvard University's John F. Kennedy School of Government program for Senior Executives in State and Local Government as a David Bohnett LGBTQ Victory Institute Leadership Fellow.

Elections

2016
Herod defeated fellow Democrat Aaron Goldhamer in the Democratic primary. In the general election, she defeated Republican Evan Vanderpool, winning 84.81% of the vote.

2018
Herod ran unopposed in both the Democratic primary and the general election.

2020
Herod again ran unopposed in both the Democratic primary and the general election.

2023
On September 8, 2022, Herod announced her candidacy for Mayor of Denver. The election will take place on April 4, 2023.

References

External links  
 Leslie Herod (D) for Mayor

Living people
Democratic Party members of the Colorado House of Representatives
Lesbian politicians
LGBT state legislators in Colorado
LGBT African Americans
African-American women in politics
Women state legislators in Colorado
African-American state legislators in Colorado
1982 births
21st-century American politicians
21st-century American women politicians
21st-century African-American women
21st-century African-American politicians
20th-century African-American people
20th-century African-American women